Liarozole is a retinoic acid metabolism-blocking drug and aromatase inhibitor.

References

Aromatase inhibitors
Benzimidazoles
Chloroarenes
CYP17A1 inhibitors
Imidazoles